was a Japanese ice hockey player. He competed in the men's tournament at the 1936 Winter Olympics.

References

1912 births
1988 deaths
Japanese ice hockey players
Olympic ice hockey players of Japan
Ice hockey players at the 1936 Winter Olympics
Sportspeople from Tokyo